Football Club Les Lilas is a French football club based in Les Lilas, Seine-Saint-Denis. It was founded in 1947. The club currently plays in the Championnat de France Amateurs 2, the fifth tier of the French football league system.

Honours
Champions DH Paris: 1995

External links
Soccerway profile

Association football clubs established in 1947
1947 establishments in France
Les Lilas
Les Lilas